Ormskirk Grammar School was a school in Ormskirk, West Lancashire, England.

History
It was founded circa 1610 and moved from the original school house at Barkhouse Hill to Ruff Lane in 1850. The architect Sydney Smirke designed the original school room and school masters' house which is to the west of the main school building. The school was consistently extended for the next 150 years to extend either side of Mill Street. It was situated in the east of the town, towards the hospital.

In the 1960s it had 750 boys and girls, and 850 in the early 1970s.

Comprehensive
It became a comprehensive in the late 1970s, year by year, with around 1,000 boys and girls.

Closure
It closed when the school amalgamated with Cross Hall High School, resulting in the formation of Ormskirk School in 2001 and was largely demolished to make way for housing in 2005 leaving only the original building on Ruff Lane which has now been converted into flats.

Archives
The school's archives are held at Lancashire Archives.

Notable former pupils

 Julie Conalty, Bishop of Birkenhead
 John P. Marshall, British businessman
Lee Cain, former journalist and Downing Street Director of Communications, 2019–2020
 Ray Connolly, novelist
 Frederick Charles Darwent, Bishop of Aberdeen and Orkney, 1978–92
 Vickey Dixon, hockey player
 Arthur Greer, 1st Baron Fairfield, Lord Justice of Appeal, 1927–38
 Tom Middlehurst, Welsh Assembly Member from 1999 to 2003 for Alyn and Deeside
 Helen Hayes, Labour Member of Parliament since 2015 for Dulwich and West Norwood
Alyson Rudd, sports journalist with The Times
Professor Edward Peck, academic and Vice-Chancellor Nottingham Trent University
 Danny Breithaupt, Chief Executive from 2001 of The Restaurant Group (Frankie and Benny's)
 Alan Cocks, professional footballer

References
 History of Ormskirk Grammar School in Lancashire, David Orritt, 30 November 1988, Carnegie,

External links
 Image
 Conversion into flats

Ormskirk
Defunct grammar schools in England
Educational institutions disestablished in 2001
Educational institutions established in the 1610s
Schools in the Borough of West Lancashire
Defunct schools in Lancashire
1610 establishments in England
2001 disestablishments in England